Monte Argentario is a comune (municipality) and a peninsula belonging to the Province of Grosseto in the Italian region Tuscany, located about  south of Florence and about  south of Grosseto. The peninsula is connected with the mainland by three spits of land which form two lagoons, the Laguna di Ponente on the west side and the Laguna di Levante on the east side of the middle dam. 
The two main villages on Monte Argentario are Porto Santo Stefano, chief town, facing north, and Porto Ercole facing south.

The panoramic road Strada panoramica starts in Porto Santo Stefano allowing splendid views of the coast and the Tuscan Archipelago.

Monte Argentario borders the comune of Orbetello, which is located on the middle dam between the two lagoons.

Geography

Monte Argentario is a promontory stretching towards the Tyrrhenian Sea in correspondence of the two southernmost islands of the Tuscan Archipelago, Giglio and Giannutri. The promontory was an island in the past, but the sea currents and the Albegna river joined it with the mainland through two so-called tomboli (stretches of land), the Tombolo of Giannella and the Tombolo of the Feniglia.

The landscape and the coast are mainly rocky, with numerous harbors, usually with rock beaches. The municipal seat is in the northern settlement, Porto Santo Stefano. The other main settlement in the township is Porto Ercole.

Argentarola cave lies close to Argentario promontory. The high quality speleothems that have been collected from this cave have allowed scientists to study the 215,000 year history of sea-level oscillations in this region.

History

The promontory, probably already inhabited by the Etruscans, was a personal property of the Domitii Ahenobarbi family, who obtained it in return for the money they lent to the Roman Republic in the Punic Wars. The current name probably finds its origin here, since Argentarii was the name of money lenders in ancient Rome.

Later an imperial possession, it was ceded to the church by Constantine the Great in the 4th century AD. In the Middle Ages, due to the reduced traffic passing on the nearby Via Aurelia, the area was sparsely settled. In the heart of the Middle Ages, the promontory became a possession of the Monastery of San Paolo in Rome. It represented in the so-called Carolingian Gate at the Monastery of St. Anastius outside Rome. Following the history of Orbetello, the promontory was a possession of the Aldobrandeschi, the Orsini, King Ladislaus of Naples and Siena, until Spain acquired it in the late 16th century. The Spaniards heavily fortified the two ports, as the main stronghold of the State of Presidi. In 1815, after Napoleon's defeat, the Argentario was handed over to the Grand Duchy of Tuscany, to which it belonged until 1860, when it became part of the newly united Kingdom of Italy.

The painter Michelangelo Merisi, known as Caravaggio, died of a fever at Porto Ercole in 1610.

During World War II, the settlements of Argentario were heavily bombed, with numerous losses. The port of Santo Stefano was destroyed, and was rebuilt only in the 1950s. The railway that connected Orbetello to the mainland was never rebuilt.

Main sights
Monastery of the Presentation and Punta Telegrafo. 
Rocca Spagnola (Spanish Fortress), in Porto Santo Stefano.
Forte Filippo and Forte Stella, in Porto Ercole.
The church of St. Erasmus, in the historical centre of Porto Ercole, not far from the Porta Pisana.
The Via panoramica (Panoramic Road), running alongside the coast.
Argentario Aquarium

Notable people
 Caravaggio (1571–1610), artist
 Paul of the Cross (1694–1775), mystic, and founder of the Passionists
 Susanna Agnelli (1922–2009), politician, former mayor of Monte Argentario
 Juliana of the Netherlands (1909–2004),  Queen of the Netherlands 
 Benedetta Barzini (born 1943), actress and model
 Giorgetto Giugiaro (born 1938), designer
 Jessica Brando (born 1994), singer
 Luca Coscioni (1967–2006), economist and politician
 Angelo Cardinal Comastri (born 1943), Bishop of Massa Marittima-Piombino, later named cardinal
 Pino Luongo (born 1953), New York restaurateur; cookbook writer and memoirist
 Jorge Chaminé (born 1956), baritone
 Guido Carli (1914–93), banker, economist and politician
 Giangiacomo Feltrinelli (1926–1972), publisher
 Rossana Podestà (1934–2013), actress
 Olin Stephens (1908–2008), American yacht designer
 Andrei Sakharov (1921–89), Soviet nuclear physicist, dissident and human rights activist
 Don Lurio, (1929–2003), dancer, choreographer and presenter
 Amintore Fanfani (1908–99), economist and politician
 Raffaella Carrà (1943–2021), singer, dancer, television presenter, and actress.

See also
Yacht Club Santo Stefano
Costa Concordia disaster
Forte La Rocca Lighthouse

References

External links

Official website 

Peninsulas of Italy
Geographical, historical and cultural regions of Italy
Tombolos